Josip Iličić (born 29 January 1988) is a Slovenian professional footballer who plays as a forward for Slovenian PrvaLiga club Maribor.

Iličić began his professional career with Slovenian club Bonifika, later also playing for Interblock and Maribor in his home country, before moving to Italy in 2010 to join Palermo. In 2013, he signed for Fiorentina, and subsequently for Atalanta in 2017. After spending twelve years in Italy, Iličić returned to Maribor in 2022.

He enjoyed his best time as a professional footballer with Atalanta, scoring eleven or more league goals in each of his first three years at the club and was awarded a spot in the 2018–19 Serie A Team of the Year. He is the first player to ever score four away goals in a Champions League knockout match, and is also the oldest player to score four goals in a Champions League knockout match.

Iličić made his senior debut for the Slovenia national team in August 2010 in a friendly match against Australia. Three years after his debut, he scored his first international goal against Cyprus in September 2013. In total, he made 79 appearances for the team in his eleven-year career.

Club career

Early career
Born in Prijedor, SR Bosnia and Herzegovina, Iličić started his career playing in the youth teams of Triglav Kranj and later Britof from Kranj. At the age of 19, he moved to SC Bonifika, where he played for a season in the Slovenian Second League. It was there when his talent was spotted by Interblock, where he stayed for two seasons playing in the Slovenian top division. At the end of the 2009–10 season, Interblock was relegated into 2. SNL after two qualifications matches against Triglav. Despite being one of the best players of his club and one of the top prospects of Slovenian football Iličić finished the season as a reserve.

Aged 21, Iličić contemplated an idea of finishing his playing career altogether. He wanted to return to futsal, his passion, and to find a job, however, a few weeks later he received a phone call from Zlatko Zahovič, the director of football at Maribor, who proposed he should sign for the club. In a life changing decision, Iličić took the offer immediately and moved to Slovenia's second largest city, where he made a big impact from the start as he scored twice in the UEFA Europa League qualifying match against Scottish Premier League club Hibernian in July 2010. He then scored again, in the return leg of the UEFA Europa League playoff round against Sicilian Palermo, which ended in a 3–2 win for the Slovenian side. On the very next day, it was confirmed that Palermo had acquired Iličić and teammate Armin Bačinović from Maribor for a permanent move. The transfer fee paid by Palermo was undisclosed, but it was reported to be around €2.3 million.

Palermo
Iličić debuted for Palermo in the Serie A on 12 September 2010 against Brescia, replacing Giulio Migliaccio in the second half. In the next round, he was already a starter and scored his first goal for Palermo at home against reigning champions Internazionale. Only four days later, on 23 September 2010, he scored his second goal of the season, this time against another Italian giant Juventus. His good performances against top Italian teams continued when he scored a goal against Fiorentina on 3 October 2010, and against Roma on 28 November 2010.

On 20 June 2011, Iličić signed a new five-year contract. He changed his shirt number to 27 on 16 August 2011. However, in the 2011–12 season Iličić struggled to make an impact mostly due to Javier Pastore – Iličić's attacking midfield partner – being sold in a record bid to Paris Saint-Germain, and Iličić provided only two goals as a result. Despite that, he was confirmed for the 2012–13 season as well, being paired with new signing Franco Brienza in a 3–4–2–1 formation by new head coach Gian Piero Gasperini. Iličić's top moment of the season came on 24 November 2012, when he scored a winning brace in a 3–1 home win for a struggling Palermo side against Catania in the Sicilian derby.

Fiorentina
On 23 July 2013, Palermo officially confirmed the sale of Iličić to Serie A rivals Fiorentina on their website. Later, the deal was officially announced by Fiorentina on their website. The transfer fee was undisclosed, reported to be in the sum of €9 million including add-ons. He scored six goals in his first season at Fiorentina. The 2014–15 season was more successful for him, finishing as the club's top scorer with ten goals in all competitions, along with Mario Gómez.

Atalanta

On 5 July 2017, Atalanta signed Iličić from Fiorentina for a reported fee of €5.5 million after Fiorentina declined to offer him a contract extension. Iličić made an immediate impact in his first year at Atalanta, scoring 11 times in a seventh-place finish.

The following year, he scored twelve times in a historic season as Atalanta finished third in the Serie A, earning them a spot in the 2019–20 UEFA Champions League group stage for the first time. He was also awarded a spot in the 2018–19 Serie A Team of the Year along with teammate Duván Zapata.

On 25 January 2020, Iličić scored a hat-trick, which included a free kick goal from the halfway line, in a 7–0 victory over Torino.

On 10 March 2020, Iličić scored all four Atalanta's goals in the 2019–20 UEFA Champions league round of 16 match against Spanish side Valencia, to secure a 4–3 win and help Atalanta progress to the quarter-finals. He also became the first player in the history of the competition to score four goals in an away tie of a knockout stage match, and the oldest player at the time to score four goals in a single match in the competition at the age of 32 years and 41 days, surpassing Zlatan Ibrahimović. Iličić also received UEFA's Player of the Week award after the Champions League round of 16 matches. Later in 2020, Iličić was nominated for the UEFA 50 Men's Team of the Year.

After spending five years with the club, his contract with Atalanta was terminated by mutual consent on 31 August 2022. Overall, Iličić made 173 appearances for Atalanta and scored 60 goals.

Return to Maribor
After twelve years of playing in Serie A, Iličić returned to Slovenia and joined his former club Maribor on 5 October 2022, signing a contract until June 2025. He made his second debut for Maribor a month later, on 6 November, in a 5–1 home win over Mura, where he also scored Maribor's fifth goal from the penalty spot.

International career
Iličić made his international debut with the Slovenian under-20 team in October 2008 in a match against Croatia. Overall, he made four appearances for the team, all of them in the Mirop Cup. He also played for the under-21 team between 2009 and 2010, including two appearances in the qualifiers for the 2011 UEFA European Under-21 Championship.

Iličić missed out on the 2010 FIFA World Cup but made his debut for the senior team in a friendly match against Australia on 11 August 2010. He scored his first international goal on 10 September 2013 against Cyprus.

Style of play
A predominantly left-footed player, Iličić is capable of playing as a second striker, as a wide midfielder or winger on either flank, or even in a central role as an attacking midfielder in a 4–2–3–1 or 4–3–1–2 system. His former Palermo coach, Bortolo Mutti, believed that the 4–3–3 system was the perfect formation for his characteristics, as it allowed him to be deployed on the right flank, a position from which he could cut inside and strike on goal with his stronger left foot. He has also been deployed as a central midfielder on occasion, although this is not his preferred position. During his time at Atalanta, he has often been used in a free advanced role in a fluid 3–4–3 formation under manager Gian Piero Gasperini.

A powerful and accurate striker of the ball with either foot, in particular from distance, he is highly regarded for his touch on the ball, technique, dribbling skills, and creativity, as well as his physical strength, leadership, strong personality, and instinctive play on the pitch; he is also known for his use of feints, in particular the back-heel move, and is an accurate set piece and penalty taker. While he is known for his composure, ability to find space, and eye for goal, he is also an excellent playmaker and assist provider, courtesy of his vision, crossing, and precise passing ability, in particular with the outside of his boot, which enables him to contribute to his team's offensive plays effectively by creating goalscoring chances for himself or his teammates. Moreover, he is a hard-working player, who possesses quick feet, poise, and elegance in possession, despite his tall stature, athletic build, and lack of significant pace or acceleration. Despite his talent and ability, he has been accused by certain pundits of being inconsistent at times, and has also drawn criticism over his difficult character, defensive positioning, and tactical awareness, in particular in his youth, although he was able to improve on the mental aspect of his game as he matured and his career progressed, which saw him reach his prime and maintain a consistent level of performance into his early 30s. His playing style and speed of thought has earned him the nickname Il Professore ("The Professor") in the Italian media.

Personal life
Josip Iličić was born in Prijedor, present-day Bosnia and Herzegovina and moved to Kranj, present-day Slovenia when he was only one year old, together with his mother Ana and brother Igor, after his father was killed. Iličić was once asked in an interview if he would be interested in playing for Croatia national team, due to his Croatian ancestry, but he replied that he would have never accepted the offer due to the fact he had lived in Slovenia his whole life. Later, he made a similar comment regarding Bosnia and Herzegovina, the country where he was born.

In 2020 he suffered from depression due to the COVID-19 pandemic. In early 2022, Iličić suffered again from mental health problems and was absent from the Atalanta squad.

Career statistics

Club

International

Scores and results list Slovenia's goal tally first, score column indicates score after each Iličić goal.

Honours
Interblock
Slovenian Cup: 2008–09
Slovenian Supercup runner-up: 2009

Maribor
Slovenian Supercup runner-up: 2010

Palermo
Coppa Italia runner-up: 2010–11

Fiorentina
Coppa Italia runner-up: 2013–14

Atalanta
Coppa Italia runner-up: 2018–19, 2020–21

Individual
Serie A Team of the Year: 2018–19
Slovenian Footballer of the Year: 2019

See also
List of Slovenia international footballers

References

External links

Player profile at NZS 

1988 births
Living people
Slovenian people of Bosnia and Herzegovina descent
Slovenian people of Croatian descent
Croats of Bosnia and Herzegovina
Sportspeople from Kranj
Slovenian footballers
Association football midfielders
Association football wingers
NK Triglav Kranj players
NK IB 1975 Ljubljana players
NK Maribor players
Palermo F.C. players
ACF Fiorentina players
Atalanta B.C. players
Slovenian Second League players
Slovenian PrvaLiga players
Serie A players
Slovenia youth international footballers
Slovenia under-21 international footballers
Slovenia international footballers
Slovenian expatriate footballers
Slovenian expatriate sportspeople in Italy
Expatriate footballers in Italy
People with mood disorders